The 2009–10 Syrian Premier League was the 39th season of the Syrian Premier League. The season began on 9 October 2009 and ended on May 7, 2010.

 Al-Futowa and Hutteen were relegated from the previous season.
 Afrin and Al-Jazeera moved up from the Syrian League 1st Division.

Team information

Stadia and locations

Final league table

Syrian Premier League Winner

Results
The 2009–10 Syrian Premier League season will be played over 26 rounds.

Round 1

Round 2

Round 3

Round 4

Round 5

Round 6

Round 7

Round 8

Round 9

Round 10

Round 11

Round 12

Round 13

Round 14

Round 15

Round 16

Round 17

Round 18

Round 19

Round 20

Round 21

Round 22

Round 23

Round 24

Round 25

Round 26

Top goalscorers
15 goals
  Firas Kashosh (Al-Taliya)

12 goals
  Abdulrahman Akkari (Teshrin)
  Amar Zakour (Omayya)
  Samer Awad (Al-Majd)

11 goals
  Majed Al Haj (Al-Jaish)

10 goals
  Mohamad Hamwi (Al-Karamah)
  Maher Al Sayed (Al-Jaish)
  Phillimon Chepita (Al-Jaish)

See also
 2009–10 Syrian Cup

References

External links
 Details at goalzz.com
  Details at syrian-soccer.com
  Details at kooora.com

Syrian Premier League seasons
1
Syria